Preston Singletary (born 1963) is a Native American glass artist.

Biography 
Preston Singletary was born in 1963 in San Francisco, California. He grew up in the Seattle-area listening to stories told by his great-grandparents, who were both full Tlingit.

Shortly after graduating high school, Singletary (who was actively pursuing a career as a musician at the time) was asked by Dante Marioni to work as a night watchman at what was then the Glass Eye, a Seattle glass-blowing studio. Singletary quickly moved from being night watchman to working the day shift to eventually joining one of the studio’s production teams. In 1984, Singletary took part in a workshop at Pilchuck Glass School for the first time. He has since been involved in Pilchuck as a teacher, student,  and more recently as a member of its Board of Trustees. Singletary has blown glass around the world in countries such as Sweden, Italy, and Finland. In the late 1980s, Singletary began incorporating traditional Tlingit themes into his work and reaching out to other Northwest Coast Native American artists.

Work 

Early on, Singletary’s work drew heavily from European glass artworks, especially those done in the Modernist style. Today he is perhaps best known for his use of glass to express and explore traditional Tlingit themes. Many of his works reference clan crests, including the killer whale, which his family claims. Singletary has worked extensively with other native artists creating glass art works such as the Founders Totem Pole (2001) and Devilfish Prow, one of a series created in collaboration with Maori artist Lewis Tamihana Gardiner (2007).

In 2018 Singletary received the Washington State Governor's Arts and Heritage Award. In 2022 Singletary’s work was featured in an exhibition entitled Raven and the Box of Daylight at the National Museum of the American Indian. The same year Singletary became a Fellow of the American Craft Council. Several of his pieces were acquired by the Smithsonian American Art Museum as part of the Renwick Gallery's 50th Anniversary Campaign.

Collections 
 Brooklyn Museum of Art, Brooklyn, NY
 Canadian Museum of History
 Corning Museum of Glass, Corning, NY (Rakow Commission)
 Detroit Institute of Arts, Detroit, MI
 Museum of Fine Arts, Boston, MA
 National Museum of the American Indian, Smithsonian Institution, Washington, DC
 Seattle Art Museum, Seattle, WA

References

Bibliography 
Kastner, Caroline, ed. Fusing Traditions: Transformations in Glass by Native American Artists. Museum of Craft & Folk Art, San Francisco, c. 2002.
Ganglehoff, Bonnie, “Glass Act,” Southwest Art, c. 1999, 
 Museum of Glass. ''Preston Singletary: Echoes, Fire, and Shadows," 2009.

External links
 Preston Singletary | 2022 ACC Fellow video
 Preston Singletary on his heritage and Tlingit mythology video from Craft in America

1963 births
Living people
20th-century Native Americans
21st-century Native Americans
Artists from San Francisco
American glass artists
Native American sculptors
Recipients of the Rakow Commission
Sculptors from California
Tlingit people
Date of birth missing (living people)
Native American male artists
Artists from Seattle